Gichugu Constituency is an electoral constituency in Kenya. It is one of four constituencies in Kirinyaga County. The constituency was established for the 1963 elections. Between 1966 and 1983 elections it was known as Kirinyaga East Constituency.

Members of Parliament

Locations and wards

Registered Voters per Ward

View current Stats from

Members of County Assembly (MCAs) 2022

Electoral history

2017

2013

References

External links 
Map of the constituency

Constituencies in Kirinyaga County
Constituencies in Central Province (Kenya)
1963 establishments in Kenya
Constituencies established in 1963